Andrew Ball may refer to:
Andrew Ball (Royal Navy officer) (died 1653), English navy captain
Andrew Ball (sailor), New Zealand sailor
Andrew Ball (Townsville pioneer) (died 1894), Queensland, Australia
Andrew Ball (curler), 2010 Ontario Men's Curling Championship
Andrew Ball (comics), writer of Marvel CyberComics
Andrew Ball (pianist) (1950–2022) British pianist